Lucky Terror is a 1936 American Western film directed by Alan James.

Plot summary

Cast 
Hoot Gibson as Lucky Carson aka The Lucky Terror
Charles Hill as Doc Halliday
Lona Andre as Ann Thornton aka Madame Fatima
George Chesebro as Jim Thornton (Ann's uncle)
Robert McKenzie as Sheriff Hodges
Jack Rockwell as Bat Moulton
Frank Yaconelli as Anthony "Tony" Giribaldi (Doc's flunky)
Charles King as Wheeler (lawyer)
Horace B. Carpenter

External links 

1936 films
American Western (genre) films
American black-and-white films
1936 Western (genre) films
Films directed by Alan James
1930s English-language films
1930s American films